The Remon–Eisenhower Treaty, was a 1955 treaty between the United States and Panama that updated and amended the original Hay–Bunau-Varilla Treaty of 1903 for the Panama Canal and Panama Canal Zone. Other aspects of the treaty covered local trader / worker rights, upgrades and military base usage.

Background 
In 1952, José Antonio Remón Cantera, a former police commander in chief, won the presidential election in Panama. To further get the approval of the town of Panama City, Remon followed a famous saying in Spanish, "Ni millones ni limosnas, queremos justicia." ("Neither millions nor alms, we want justice.")

Negotiations 
The negotiations began in September 1953. Amazingly, they partially ended in December 1954—partially, because in December, one point of the treaty was missing. Panama was to grant the United States its military base in Rio Hato. This brings back the treaties in 1942, when Panama actually granted the United States around 130 bases throughout the country, for World War II. These bases were to be given back to Panama, but the USA tried extending that in the Convent of 1947. The USA failed. A couple of days later, they were given back to Panama. The negotiations ended on 25 January 1955.

Jose Antonio Remon Cantera 

President Remon got shot and died on 2 January 1955. Nevertheless, the treaty was given his name (Remon–Eisenhower) due to the large efforts and never-ending fights against the U.S. for this treaty. The story of his death is unknown, and the person who shot him was caught, but was found only to be the killer; he had personal reasons. A further theory says he got shot because of not allowing the United States the Rio Hato base, which was granted after he died, in the treaty. Nevertheless, there is no actual evidence of this.

Treaty summary 
In summary, the treaty contains the following:

The treaty raised the annual payment of the canal (from US-Panama) from $430,000, to $1.93 million. As a consequence, Panama agreed to lower, by 75%, the tax on national liquors sold in the Panama Canal Zone.
Panama was granted the right to charge taxes to Panamanians working in the canal and railroads operating inside the Zone or out of it.
The United States gave back Panamanian jurisdiction of the lands in "Punta Paitilla". It also gave back the lands of "Nuevo Cristobal", "Playa de Colon", and the Lesseps area. Panama, as a consequence, had multi-tasks to "beautify" the U.S. embassy in Panama. These tasks included the construction of a park in front of the embassy, and the fixing of two properties next to the embassy.
The construction of a bridge over the canal, by the USA.
The permitting of local traders to sell to ships crossing the canal.
The equality of local workers and Americans in the Canal. (Finally, the elimination of the Gold/Silver roll.)
The United States was to avoid contraband in the canal.
One point which Remon did not approve, and which the U.S. had been requesting since 1947. This point was finally conceded after Remon's death. The United States was granted, with no cost or 'trick', the military base and beach in Rio Hato, for a period of 15 years. The base was given back on 22 August 1970, after the government of General Torrijos refused to renew US use.

See also 
 Hay–Bunau-Varilla Treaty of 1903
 Torrijos–Carter Treaties of 1977
 List of treaties

References

Sources 
Fitgerald, Luis I.; Historia de las Relaciones entre Panama y los Estados Unidos. (In Spanish.)

History of Panama
Panama–United States relations
Panama Canal Zone
Treaties of the United States
Treaties of Panama
Treaties concluded in 1955
Presidency of Dwight D. Eisenhower